Tejen District is a district of Ahal Province in Turkmenistan.It covers an area of 12,000 km2 with an estimated 110,000 people in 2006. The main city is Tejen, located near the Hanhowuz Reservoir. The main highway is the M37 highway. Berdi Kerbabayev was born in this district.

References

Districts of Turkmenistan
Ahal Region